The Union – Nikola Tesla University is a private university located in Belgrade, established in 2010.  It has several faculties in Belgrade and also in Sremski Karlovci, Surdulica and Trstenik.

References

Universities in Belgrade